Las Villas is one of 28 parishes (administrative divisions) in the municipality of Grado, within the province and autonomous community of Asturias, in northern Spain. 

The population is 27 (INE 2007).

Villages and hamlets
 Noceda
 Las Villas

References

Parishes in Grado